Mark M. Baker is a New York City criminal defense attorney. He is mainly known for obtaining an acquittal with then partner, Barry I. Slotnick, of New York City resident Bernhard Goetz on attempted murder and assault charges related to his shooting of four would-be muggers on a subway train in 1984.

As an appellate attorney, he has also represented Gambino crime family crime boss John Gotti, Sr., Genovese crime family Crime Boss Vincent Gigante, and various international political figures.

Currently, Baker is of Counsel to Brafman & Associates, the law firm of attorney Benjamin Brafman. Before joining that firm, Baker was a partner with Barry I. Slotnick at what was then known as Slotnick and Baker, LLP where he began his private practice after five years with the Brooklyn District Attorney's Office and another 5½ as a New York State Special Assistant Attorney General in the then Office of the Special Prosecutor Investigating the New York City Criminal Justice System.

Baker is a former adjunct professor at Touro Law School, has served as an on-air legal analyst, and lectures annually at Harvard and St. John's law schools.

Mark M. Baker holds a B.S. from Syracuse University, and a Juris Doctor from Brooklyn Law School.

References

Living people
Brooklyn Law School alumni
New York (state) lawyers
Harvard Law School faculty
Syracuse University alumni
Criminal defense lawyers
Year of birth missing (living people)